Kal Chal (also Romanized as Kal Chāl; also known as Golchāl) is a village in Lat Leyl Rural District, Otaqvar District, Langarud County, Gilan Province, Iran. At the 2006 census, its population was 140, in 35 families.

References 

Populated places in Langarud County